The 2006 Men's Hockey Hamburg Masters was the twelfth edition of the Hamburg Masters, consisting of a series of test matches. It was held in Hamburg, Germany, from 25 to 27 August 2006, and featured four of the top nations in men's field hockey.

Competition format
The tournament featured the national teams of the Netherlands, Pakistan, Spain, and the hosts, Germany, competing in a round-robin format, with each team playing each other once. Three points were awarded for a win, one for a draw, and none for a loss.

Officials
The following umpires were appointed by the International Hockey Federation to officiate the tournament:

 Christian Bläsch (GER)
 Andrew Mair (SCO)
 Haider Rasool (IRE)
 Juan Requena (ESP)
 Rob ten Cate (NED)

Results
All times are local (Central European Summer Time).

Pool

Fixtures

Statistics

Final standings

Goalscorers

References

External links
Official website
Deutscher Hockey-Bund

2006
Men's
2006 in Dutch sport
2006 in German sport
2006 in Spanish sport
Sport in Hamburg
August 2006 sports events in Europe